Teeline is a shorthand system developed in 1968 by James Hill, a teacher of Pitman Shorthand. It is accepted by the National Council for the Training of Journalists, which certifies the training of journalists in the United Kingdom. 

It is mainly used for writing English within the Commonwealth of Nations, but can be adapted for use by other Germanic languages such as German and Swedish. Its strength over other forms of shorthand is fast learning, and speeds of up to 150 words per minute are possible, as it is common for users to create their own word groupings, increasing their speed.

Writing style
Teeline shorthand is a streamlined way to transcribe the spoken word quickly by removing unnecessary letters from words and making the letters themselves faster to write. Vowels are often removed when they are not the first or last letter of a word, and silent letters are also ignored. Common prefixes, suffixes, and letter groupings (such as "sh" and "ing") are reduced to single symbols. The symbols themselves are derived from the old cursive forms of the letter and the unnecessary parts are again stripped leaving only the core of the letter left. Unlike phonetics based shorthands, such as Pitman, Teeline is a spelling based system.

Alphabet

Teeline differs from many shorthand systems by basing itself on the alphabet as opposed to phonetics, making it simpler to learn but also carrying the speed limitations of the alphabet when compared to other systems. However, it is common to find some phonetics spellings used. For example, ph is often just written as an f, so the word phase would be written as if it were spelt fase. This coincides with the creator's intentions of streamlining it as much as possible. As with many shorthand systems, there are few strict rules on how to write it, so it is common for users to make personal adaptations for their own use. Certain letters also have specific meanings as well as their traditional alphabetic value, as shown in the table below.

Note: there may also be some regional, dialectal, and linguistic additions to these.

Writing technique

Teeline eliminates unnecessary letters, so that the remaining letters can be written in one swift, sweeping movement. People who use it daily will run words together: proficient users develop their own forms for common phrases, such as "more and more people" and "in the end".

It is possible to write most words using basic Teeline theory, which consists of the alphabet and vowel indicators, but learning advanced Teeline theory allows users to increase their speed to well in excess of 100 words per minute.

Examples of Teeline theory include blending of letters (such as CM, CN and PL) and the R principle.

Doubling is also commonly used in Teeline - this involves lengthening the outlines for D, T, L, M and W to indicate that an R comes after these outlines - for example, the "D" outline becomes "DR" when it is lengthened, and "M" becomes "MR".

Speed can be dramatically increased through the use of reduced suffixes and prefixes that occur frequently, such as "under-", "multi-" and "trans-", along with "-nce", "nch", "-able" and "-ing".

Adaptations
Although Teeline is used primarily in English, it has been adapted to other languages in the past, namely Welsh, French, German, and Spanish,.

Notable users 
Alastair Campbell used Teeline to write his diaries while serving as spokesman for UK Prime Minister Tony Blair. He has claimed to have 120 wpm ability. Campbell's tutor later reported that he was first in his class, reaching 100 wpm before others. But political pundit Roy Campbell-Greenslade has questioned the value of shorthand in the digital era, noting an instance where a reporter's scrawl could not be read by a court-appointed Teeline expert. British MP Meg Hillier has said she wields Teeline at 100 wpm and is wary of any reporter who fires questions at her faster than she herself could jot down. Jon Harris of Cavendish Press says training programmes that omit Teeline are short-changing their trainees. "Shorthand makes for a more rounded reporter; yet without it some of these courses are just 'Del Boy' degrees," he told the UK Press Gazette.

In popular culture 
Teeline appears on the cover of the album The Gaelic Chronicles by The Budapest Café Orchestra. Fiddler Christian Garrick said he was astounded to find a reporter using shorthand during an interview, and asked her to scrawl the words for the album cover.

Teeline is referenced in "You're with us now", the sixth episode of the second season of the American television show Hanna, as a journalist's method for keeping notes that cannot be easily read by others.

It supplies a clue in episode 6 of series 7 of the Anglo-French TV show Death in Paradise entitled "Meditated in Murder".

References

Shorthand systems
Transcription (linguistics)
Writing systems introduced in 1968